Climie may refer to:

People with the given name
Climie Fisher, a UK pop duo formed by vocalist Simon Climie and keyboardist Rob Fisher

People with the surname
Jock Climie, Canadian CFL (Canadian Football League) player
John C. Climie (1828–1916), Scottish-born Australian engineer
Matt Climie (born 1983), Canadian ice hockey 
Simon Climie (born 1957), English songwriter/producer and the former lead singer of the UK duo Climie Fisher

See also
 Clime